Ritchie Mines Wildlife Management Area, is located near Smithville, West Virginia in Ritchie County.

To access the WMA from the south, follow Route 47 west 8 miles from Smithville to Macfarlan Creek Road.  Follow Macfarlan Creek Road north to the WMA.

Hunting and Fishing

Hunting opportunities in Pruntytown State Farm WMA include deer,  grouse, raccoon, squirrel, and turkey.

Although camping is not allowed at the WMA, camping is available at nearby North Bend State Park. A historically significant asphalt mine is located on the WVA.  Fishing is also available at North Bend.

See also

Animal conservation
Hunting
Fishing
List of West Virginia wildlife management areas

References

External links
West Virginia DNR District 6 Wildlife Management Areas
West Virginia Hunting Regulations
West Virginia Fishing Regulations

Wildlife management areas of West Virginia
Protected areas of Ritchie County, West Virginia
IUCN Category V